Nick Fury is a fictional character appearing in American comic books published by Marvel Comics.

Nick Fury may also refer to:
 Nick Fury (Marvel Cinematic Universe), character in the Marvel Cinematic Universe, portrayed by Samuel L. Jackson
 Nick Fury (Ultimate Marvel character), character in the Ultimate Marvel Universe comics
 Nick Fury Jr., the original Nick Fury's son
 Nick Fury, Agent of S.H.I.E.L.D. (feature), a feature in Strange Tales
 Nick Fury, Agent of S.H.I.E.L.D. (comic book), a comic book title starring Nick Fury
 Nick Fury (comic book), a 2017 comic book starring Nick Fury Jr.
 Nick Fury: Agent of S.H.I.E.L.D. (film), a television film starring David Hasselhoff
 Nicholas Loftin, American record producer known by the nickname "Nick Fury"

See also
 List of Nick Fury comics